Drum Island may refer to:

Drum Island, on the Cooper River (South Carolina), Charleston, South Carolina, under the Cooper River Bridge
Drum Island, slightly west of Port Albert, Victoria
Drum Island, an island in Frenchboro, Maine, Hancock County on the Bass Harbor
Drum Island, Citrus County, Florida
Drum Island (band)